Dzierżążnik may refer to the following places:
Dzierżążnik, Greater Poland Voivodeship (west-central Poland)
Dzierżążnik, Pomeranian Voivodeship (north Poland)
Dzierżążnik, Warmian-Masurian Voivodeship (north Poland)